The Warren Anatomical Museum, housed within Harvard Medical School's Countway Library of Medicine, was founded in 1847 by Harvard professor John Collins Warren, whose personal collection of 160 unusual and instructive anatomical and pathological specimens now forms the nucleus of the museum's 15,000-item collection. The Warren also has objects significant to medical history, such as the inhaler used during the first public demonstration of ether-assisted surgery in 1846 (on loan to the Massachusetts General Hospital since 1948), and the skull of Phineas Gage, who survived a large iron bar being driven through his brain. The museum's first curator was J.B.S. Jackson.

Closed until 2023
The museum gallery is closed for renovation until winter/spring 2023, as stated on the museum's website, although the collection remains accessible to researchers by appointment. Normally a rotating subset of items, including Gage's skull and the tamping iron that passed through it, is on public display.


See also
William Fiske Whitney
Harvard Dental Museum

References

Sources

External links
 Warren Museum website
 Finding aid for Warren Anatomical Museum in Francis A. Countway Library of Medicine
 Medical Heritage Library Increases Warren Museum Accessibility

History of anatomy
Harvard Medical School
Medical museums in the United States
University museums in Massachusetts
Museums in Boston
Science museums in Massachusetts